The Conant Thread—Coats & Clark Mill Complex District is a historic district encompassing a large industrial complex which straddles the border between Pawtucket and Central Falls, Rhode Island.  This  industrial area was developed in two phases, with a number of buildings surviving from both of these periods.  The first, between 1870 and 1882, resulted in the construction of Mills 2 through 5, a series of large three- and four-story brick buildings which were used in textile manufacturing.  A brick office and stables from this period were demolished in 1977, and are the only known brick structures to have been lost.  The second phase of construction was between 1917 and 1923, and included the construction of two additional four-story brick mills, a stuccoed recreation hall that has since been converted into a senior center, two two-story brick buildings, and a power plant.  This works was first developed by J & P Coats, and became an internationally known source for cotton thread.  It was for many years Pawtucket's largest employer.

The complex was listed on the National Register of Historic Places in 1983.

The complex was extensively damaged by fire, with at least eight buildings gutted and destroyed, on 14 March 2020.

See also
National Register of Historic Places listings in Pawtucket, Rhode Island
National Register of Historic Places listings in Providence County, Rhode Island

References

Industrial archaeological sites in the United States
Industrial buildings and structures in Rhode Island
Industrial buildings and structures on the National Register of Historic Places in Rhode Island
Historic districts in Providence County, Rhode Island
Buildings and structures in Pawtucket, Rhode Island
Buildings and structures in Central Falls, Rhode Island
Historic districts on the National Register of Historic Places in Rhode Island
National Register of Historic Places in Providence County, Rhode Island
National Register of Historic Places in Pawtucket, Rhode Island